Amyrus or Amyros was a town and polis (city-state) in Ancient Thessaly, in the western part of Magnesia, situated on a river of the same name falling into the lake Boebēis. It is mentioned by Hesiod as the "vine-bearing Amyrus." The surrounding country is called the Amyric plain (τὸ Ἀμυρικὸν πέδιον) by Polybius. Modern scholas identify the location of Amyrus at a place called Palaiokastro (old fort) at the modern village of Gerakari.

References

Former populated places in Greece
Populated places in ancient Thessaly
Ancient Magnesia
Cities in ancient Greece
Thessalian city-states